"Hold On" is a song written and recorded by American country music artist Rosanne Cash.  It was released in February 1986 as the third single from the album Rhythm & Romance.  The song reached #5 on the Billboard Hot Country Singles & Tracks chart.

Chart performance

References

1986 singles
1985 songs
Rosanne Cash songs
Songs written by Rosanne Cash
Columbia Records singles
Song recordings produced by Rodney Crowell